Step Up (previously titled Step Up: High Water) is an American drama television series, based on the Step Up film series. It premiered on January 31, 2018, on YouTube Red. The series was created by Holly Sorensen, who also serves as an executive producer alongside Channing Tatum and Jenna Dewan. After being canceled by YouTube Red after two seasons, Starz picked up the series for a third season, which premiered on October 16, 2022. In December 2022, the series was canceled after three seasons.

Premise
The series follows the students and faculty of "High Water", Atlanta's most cutthroat performing arts school. When twins Tal and Janelle relocate from Ohio, they find themselves thrust into a world where every move is a test. As they attempt to navigate their new world— on and off the dance floor— they will discover just how deep they are willing to dig to realize their dreams and seize their moment.

Cast and characters

Main
Lauryn McClain as Janelle Baker (season 1)
Petrice Jones (seasons 1–2) and Keiynan Lonsdale (season 3) as Tal Baker
Marcus Mitchell as Dondre Hall (seasons 1–2)
Terrence Green as Rigo Octavio 
Carlito Olivero as Davis Jimenez 
Jade Chynoweth as Odalie Allen
Kendra Oyesanya as Poppy Martinez
Eric Graise as King
Faizon Love as Al Baker
Naya Rivera (seasons 1–2) and Christina Milian (season 3) as Collette Jones 
Ne-Yo as Sage Odom
Terayle Hill as Marquise Howard (season 3; recurring seasons 1–2)
Rebbi Rose as Angel Etomi (season 3)
Enrique Murciano as Ricardo Cruz (season 3)
Tricia Helfer as Erin Baxter (season 3)

Recurring
R. Marcos Taylor as Earnest Octavio/East-O (season 1)
Al Calderon as Johnny One (season 1)
Saidah Nairobi as Electra
Ashley Greene as Nine Sanders (season 2)
Jeremy Copeland as Zo Browder (season 2)
Cruz Abelita as Justin (seasons 1-3)

Guest
Savion Glover as Quincy Hobbs
Rick Ross as himself
Will Swannell as himself
Todrick Hall as himself
Robin Givens as Dana
Travis Wall as himself
Luther Brown as himself
Tight Eyez as himself

Episodes

Season 1 (2018)

Season 2 (2019)

Season 3 (2022)

Production

Development
On June 23, 2016, YouTube announced at the annual VidCon conference in Anaheim, California that they were developing a new drama series based on the Step Up film series with Lionsgate Television producing alongside Channing Tatum and Jenna Dewan.

On June 23, 2017, YouTube announced that it had officially given Step Up: High Water a first season order consisting of ten episodes, each running about 45 minutes in length. The series was described as YouTube Red's first "big-budget, Hollywood-produced television drama" and that its arrival would end up "moving it into more direct competition with players like Netflix and traditional cable networks." In the announcement, it was revealed that each episode of the series would cost several million dollars to produce. A few days later, members of the series' creative team were announced. Original songs for the series were set to be written by singer/songwriter Jason “PooBear” Boyd and “Jingle” Jared Gutstadt. The films series’ choreographer Jamal Sims was expected to choreograph the first episode after which subsequent episodes would be choreographed by Jamaica Craft. The pilot episode was set to be directed by Adam Shankman. It was later reported that Debbie Allen had directed the show's second episode.

On May 22, 2018, it was announced that YouTube had renewed the series for a second season. On January 24, 2019, it was reported that the second season would premiere on March 20, 2019. On August 16, 2019, YouTube Premium canceled the series after two seasons. On May 28, 2020, Starz picked up the series for a third season. Following filming restrictions during the COVID-19 pandemic, Blackhall Studios reopened for production on several films and the series, which was being written at the time, on July 13, 2020. Production was immediately paused on the same day when lead actress Naya Rivera was found dead following a boating accident several days prior. Rivera's character had been set to appear; in August 2020 it was announced that a re-worked season would begin filming in January 2021. On September 17, 2022, it was announced that the third season would premiere on October 16, 2022. Days before the season finale, it was announced that Starz had canceled the series.

Casting
On June 28, 2017, it was announced that Ne-Yo, Naya Rivera, Faizon Love, Lauryn McClain, Petrice Jones, Marcus Mitchell, Jade Chynoweth, Carlito Olivero, Terrence Green, R. Marcos Taylor, Eric Graise, and Kendra Oyesanya had been cast in the series' main roles. On January 19, 2018, it was reported that Savion Glover would make a guest appearance in the series as a teacher at High Water. On August 28, 2018, it was announced that in season two Ashley Greene and Jeremy Copeland were joining the cast, that Rick Ross and Todrick Hall would appear as themselves, and that JaQuel Knight would make a cameo appearance in addition to choreographing episode three. After YouTube canceled the series, Petrice Jones moved on to other projects, leaving him unavailable by the time Starz picked up the show for Season 3. His role was filled by Keiynan Lonsdale as new character Tal Baker. Because of Naya Rivera's death, Christina Milian was cast as Collette.

Release

Marketing

On July 12, 2017, YouTube released a video introducing the show's main cast. On August 13, 2017, the cast of the series, including Jade Chynoweth and Kendra Oyesanya, performed at the 2017 Teen Choice Awards with a highly choreographed dance routine.

On December 19, 2017, YouTube released the first trailer for the series and announced that the show would premiere on January 31, 2018, with all ten episodes released at once. On January 24, 2019, the official trailer for season two was released.

Premiere
On January 30, 2018, YouTube partnered with Fathom Events for special screenings of the first episode of the series at more than 750 movie theaters. The event also included a screening of the original 2006 Step Up film that launched the five-film franchise, and a behind-the-scenes look at the making of the television series.

Reception
In a positive review, Sonia Saraiya of Variety offered the series praise saying: "This YouTube Red original has found an intriguing way to blend the mediums of dance, film, and soapy teen television, with an energetic, conscious new installment in the series that is a lot of fun to get sucked into." In another favorable critique, Deciders Kayla Cobb described the series as "a genuinely compelling and dramatic story that very well may stand as the best narrative installment of the Step Up universe."

References

External links

2010s American drama television series
2010s American high school television series
2020s American drama television series
2020s American high school television series
2018 American television series debuts
2022 American television series endings
English-language television shows
Live action television shows based on films
Television series about educators
Television series about teenagers
Television series by Lionsgate Television
Television shows set in Atlanta
Television series impacted by the COVID-19 pandemic
YouTube Premium original series
Starz original programming
American television series revived after cancellation
Step Up (film series)
Dance television shows
Hip hop television